Cory Butner (born March 27, 1981, in California) is an American bobsledder who was on silver-medalist teams during the 2012–13 Bobsleigh World Cup. He is expected to compete, with Justin Olsen, in Bobsleigh at the 2014 Winter Olympics – Two-man. He lives in Yucaipa California.

References 

1981 births
Living people
Olympic bobsledders of the United States
American male bobsledders
Bobsledders at the 2014 Winter Olympics
Place of birth missing (living people)
Sportspeople from California